Charles Thomas Reilly (February 15, 1867 – December 16, 1937) was an American professional baseball infielder. He played in Major League Baseball (MLB) from 1889 to 1897 for the Columbus Solons, Pittsburgh Pirates, Philadelphia Phillies, and Washington Senators.

Reilly was the first of two players to have four hits that included al least one home run (he hit two) in their first major league game. J. P. Arencibia is the only player in the baseball's modern era to equal this feat. Trevor Story of the Colorado Rockies also hit two home runs in his first ever Major League game (and a third home run in his second game).

In 1894, six of the National League baseball clubs organized the American League of Professional Football Clubs, a professional soccer league. Reilly played half back for Philadelphia and was a favorite of the home crowd in the inaugural game played at Philadelphia Ball Park on October 6, 1894.

References

External links

1867 births
1937 deaths
Major League Baseball infielders
Baseball players from New Jersey
People from Princeton, New Jersey
Sportspeople from Mercer County, New Jersey
Philadelphia Phillies players
Pittsburgh Pirates players
Columbus Solons players
Washington Senators (1891–1899) players
19th-century baseball players
Washington Nationals (minor league) players
Newark Domestics players
Savannah (minor league baseball) players
Eau Claire (minor league baseball) players
St. Paul Apostles players
Canton Nadjys players
Philadelphia Colts players
Syracuse Stars (minor league baseball) players
Springfield Ponies players
Denver Grizzlies (baseball) players
Minneapolis Millers (baseball) players
Kansas City Blues (baseball) players
Los Angeles Angels (minor league) managers
Los Angeles Angels (minor league) players
Los Angeles (minor league baseball) players
Spokane Indians managers
Spokane Indians players